The Hollywood Pantages Theatre, formerly known as RKO Pantages Theatre, is located at Hollywood and Vine (6233 Hollywood Boulevard), in Hollywood. Designed by architect B. Marcus Priteca, it was the last theater built by the vaudeville impresario Alexander Pantages. The palatial Art Deco theater opened on June 4, 1930, as part of the Pantages Theatre Circuit.

History

The Pantages Theatre Circuit was part of vaudeville, and the new Hollywood theater programmed first-run movies alternating through the day with vaudeville acts for its first two years.  But like other theaters during the Great Depression, it was forced to economize and thereafter operated primarily as a movie theater, though live entertainment was presented occasionally.

Alexander Pantages sold the Hollywood landmark in 1932 to Fox West Coast Theaters. In 1949, Howard Hughes acquired the Hollywood Pantages for his RKO Theatre Circuit and moved his personal offices to the building's second floor. From 1949 through 1959, the theater hosted the American motion picture industry's annual Academy Award Ceremonies. It continued to be a major venue for roadshow movies into the 1970s. From 1965, it was operated by Pacific Theatres. The Hollywood Pantages closed as a movie theater in January 1977, and re-opened the following month with Bubbling Brown Sugar, the first of the many stage productions that have since become its regular fare.

Now operated by an arm of the Nederlander Organization, the Hollywood Pantages is one of Los Angeles' leading venues for live theater (the five highest-grossing weeks in L.A.'s theatrical history were all shows at the Hollywood Pantages).  The theater has recently presented large-scale Broadway musicals such as Disney's The Lion King, which ran at the theatre for over two years, and hosted the long-running Los Angeles production of the Broadway musical Wicked.

Situated on a prime location, the area's building and a rejuvenation boom has spread to Bob Hope Square with the addition of a new W Hotel and retail stores, tied closely to the Hollywood/Vine station. The theater underwent a $10-million restoration and upgrade in 2000. The original plans for the Hollywood Pantages were for a 12-story building: two floors dedicated to theater and ten floors of office space. Completion of the ten upper floors was halted due to the 1929 stock market crash during construction. In December 2007, plans were revealed to complete the original design and additional stories, but it was never realized.

The theater has also occasionally hosted popular music concerts, including those of the bands Dream Theater, Prince, Foo Fighters and Mark Knopfler (of Dire Straits). Talking Heads' 1984 concert film Stop Making Sense was shot there. In April 1990, Alice Cooper played Pantages in front of a sold-out audience. In 1997, 4 years before her English crossover, Colombian singer-songwriter Shakira performed her first show in the United States at the Hollywood Pantages. In 2006, Mexican pop-group RBD recorded their CD/DVD Live in Hollywood at the Hollywood Pantages.

The Hollywood Pantages Theatre is also a popular location for the filming of movies, TV shows, and music videos. Concert scenes in the 1980 film The Jazz Singer and in Michael Jackson's 1995 video "You Are Not Alone" are just two examples out of many. Rickie Lee Jones's 1979 self-titled debut album includes a reference to the Pantages in her song "Chuck E.'s In Love".

Past productions
[[File:Hollywoodptheater.JPG|thumb|upright|Pantages Theatre during the 2007–2009 run of Wicked]]
Productions at the Pantages (presented by Broadway in L.A. since 1996), have included:

Bubbling Brown Sugar (1977)
Man of La Mancha (1978)
Beatlemania (1978)
La Cage aux Folles (1984-1985)
Flamenco Puro (1987)
Joseph and the Amazing Technicolor Dreamcoat (1993)
How to Succeed in Business Without Really Trying (1996)
Damn Yankees (1996)
Riverdance (1996, 1998, 2006)
Andrew Lloyd Webber–Music of the Night (1997)
West Side Story (1997)
Cats (1997, 2003, 2006)
Tango x 2 (1997)
The Phantom of the Opera (1997, 1998)
The King and I (1998, 2005)
Peter Pan (1998, 2004)
Annie (1999, 2005)
Cirque Ingenieux (1999)
Evita (1999, 2005)
The Wizard of Oz (1999)
Footloose (1999)
Jekyll & Hyde (1999)
Sunset Boulevard (1999)
Defending the Caveman (1999)
Fame (1999)
Buddy – The Buddy Holly Story (2000)
The Sound of Music (2000)
The Lion King (2000–2003, 2006)
The Producers (2003)
Chicago (2004, 2005)
Starlight Express (2004)
Mamma Mia! (2004, 2009)
Hairspray (2004, 2006)
Miss Saigon (2004)
Movin' Out (2004)
Les Misérables (2004, 2006)
Oklahoma! (2005)
Wicked (tour: 2005, sit-down: 2007–2009)
Irving Berlin's White Christmas (2005)
Dragon Tales Live (2006)
Doctor Dolittle (2006)
Stomp (2006)
Rent (2006)
Little Women (2006)
Dirty Rotten Scoundrels (2006)
RBD - Live In Hollywood (2006)
Sweet Charity (2006)
The Ten Tenors (2006)

2009
The Phantom of the Opera
Rent
Mamma Mia!
Grease
Dirty Dancing
RAIN – A Tribute to The Beatles
Fiddler on the Roof
Legally Blonde
Dr. Seuss' How the Grinch Stole Christmas!

2010
Riverdance
Stomp
The Color Purple
Cats
Chicago
Young Frankenstein
The 101 Dalmatians Musical
In the Heights
The Phantom of the Opera
West Side Story

2011
Hair
Spring Awakening
The Legend of Zelda 25th Anniversary Symphony
Rock of Ages
RAIN – A Tribute to the Beatles
Disney's Beauty and the Beast
Burn the Floor
Shrek the Musical
Wicked
Come Fly Away

2013
Peter Pan
Jekyll and Hyde
Catch Me If You Can
Priscilla, Queen of the Desert
Sister Act
The Wizard of Oz
Evita

2014
The Lion King
The Book of Mormon
Joseph and the Amazing Technicolor Dreamcoat
Ghost
Once

2015
Jersey Boys
Pippin
Kinky Boots
Wicked
An Evening With Neil DeGrasse Tyson
Newsies
Motown
The Phantom of the Opera
Annie
If/Then

2016
Bullets Over Broadway
Dirty Dancing
The Illusionists
42nd Street
Beautiful: The Carole King Musical
Cabaret
Hedwig and the Angry Inch
The King and I

2017
Rent
Motown
Finding Neverland
An American in Paris
The Bodyguard
The Book of Mormon
Hamilton

2018
Aladdin
Love Never Dies
Stomp
School of Rock
On Your Feet!
Waitress
A Bronx Tale
Wicked

2019
Hello, Dolly!
Cats
Charlie and the Chocolate Factory
Fiddler on the Roof
Les Miserables
Miss Saigon
Anastasia
Summer: The Donna Summer Musical

2020
Frozen

2021
Hamilton

2022
Moulin Rouge
Jagged Little Pill
Cats
To Kill a Mockingbird
The Book of Mormon
Jesus Christ Superstar

2023
Mean Girls
The Lion King
Six
Tina: The Tina Turner Musical
Beetlejuice
Les Misberables
MJ the Musical

2024
The Wiz
Chicago
Girl from the North Country
Mrs. Doubtfire
Peter Pan
Company

See also
 Los Angeles Historic-Cultural Monuments in Hollywood

References

External links

Movie palaces
Theatres in Hollywood, Los Angeles
Cinemas and movie theaters in Hollywood, Los Angeles
Event venues established in 1930
Los Angeles Historic-Cultural Monuments
B. Marcus Priteca buildings
Art Deco architecture in California
Hollywood Boulevard